William Jennings Stellbauer (March 20, 1894 - February 16, 1974), was a Major League Baseball outfielder who played in  with the Philadelphia Athletics. He batted and threw right-handed. Stellbauer had a .271 batting average in 25 games, 13 hits in 48 at-bats, in his one-year career.

He was born in Bremond, Texas and died in New Braunfels, Texas.

External links

1894 births
1974 deaths
Major League Baseball outfielders
Baseball players from Texas
Philadelphia Athletics players
Austin Senators players
Texarkana Tigers players
Sportspeople from New Braunfels, Texas
Peoria Distillers players
Grand Rapids Black Sox players
Ridgway (minor league baseball) players
Scranton Miners players
Houston Buffaloes players
Nashville Vols players
Fort Worth Panthers players
Okmulgee Drillers players
Marshall Snappers players
Marshall Indians players
Paris Bearcats players
People from Robertson County, Texas